Jacob Weyer, or Weier, born 1623 in Hamburg (died 1670), was a 17th-century German painter.

Biography
Little is known of his life. He was born in Hamburg in 1623. He was a battle painter influenced by Rembrandt. Weyer died in Hamburg in 1670. A battle work by him is in the collection of the National Gallery, London.

References

Jacob Weyer on Artnet
 Jacob Weyer at the Östergötlands Museum

1620s births
1670 deaths
17th-century German painters
German male painters
Artists from Hamburg